Alexis Phạm Văn Lộc (17 March 1919 – 17 November 2011) was a Vietnamese Bishop of the Catholic Church.

Lộc was born in Huế and ordained a priest on 21 August 1951. He was appointed coadjutor bishop of the Diocese of Kontum, as well as titular bishop of Respecta, on 27 March 1975, and ordained bishop on the same day. He succeeded Paul-Léon Seitz as Bishop of Kontum on 2 October 1975 and retired on 8 April 1995.

References

External links
Catholic-Hierarchy
Diocese of Kontum

People from Huế
20th-century Roman Catholic bishops in Vietnam
1919 births
2011 deaths
Place of death missing